A Tale of the White Pyramid is a short story by Willa Cather. It was first published on 22 December 1892 in The Hesperian.

Plot summary
Kakau tells about the death of Senefrau the First: his body was sealed into a sarcophagus. As a result, Kufu, the new King, is to have another pyramid built.

Characters
Kakau, son of Ramenko.
Ramenko, a 'high priest of Phatahah.
Rui, Kakau's uncle.
Senefrau the First, a King, now dead.
Kufu, the new king after Senefrau the First.

Allusions to other works
Egyptian mythology is mentioned through Osiris, Isis, and Khem.

References

External links
Full Text at the Willa Cather Archive

1892 short stories
Short stories by Willa Cather
Works originally published in the Daily Nebraskan